Medial condyle can refer to:
 Medial condyle of tibia
 Medial condyle of femur